Bidya Sundar Shakya is a Nepalese politician, who served as 14th Mayor of Kathmandu Metropolitan City. Shakya previously also served as Chairman of Ward No. 21 for two terms. He is the Province Committee Member of CPN UML Bagmati Province Committee .

See also
 2017 Kathmandu municipal election
 Kathmandu Metropolitan City

References

 

1963 births
Living people
Communist Party of Nepal (Unified Marxist–Leninist) politicians
People from Kathmandu
Mayors of Kathmandu